Allstate Insurance Co. v. Hague, 449 U.S. 302 (1981), was a conflict of laws case decided by the United States Supreme Court.

Facts
The testator, Ralph Hague, was a Wisconsin resident who worked in Minnesota. While riding his motorcycle in Wisconsin near the Minnesota border, he was hit and killed by a car driven by another Wisconsin resident. Hague's wife moved to Minnesota and was appointed administrator of his estate there. Hague had three insurance policies worth $15,000 each. The Allstate Insurance Company refused to pay on more than one of these, and Hague's wife filed a lawsuit in Minnesota against the insurance company.

Under Wisconsin law, a testator who held multiple insurance policies could only collect on one of them, but under Minnesota law, a testator could 'stack' the policies, and collect the full $45,000. The Minnesota trial court chose to apply Minnesota law based on public policy. The Minnesota Supreme Court agreed and also concluded that this was the better law. The defendant, Allstate appealed to the United States Supreme Court.

Issue
The Court was confronted with the question of whether the application of Minnesota law was a violation of either Fourteenth Amendment due process, or the Full Faith and Credit clause of the United States Constitution.

Opinion
A plurality opinion by Justice Brennan, joined by three other justices, held that both the Fourth Amendment and the Full Faith and Credit clause are satisfied so long as there are sufficient aggregate contacts. The plurality opinion found three important contacts:

Testator worked in Minnesota (commuted into Minnesota, had certain rights guaranteed there, Minnesota employer lost Testator's services)
Defendant does business in Minnesota, was familiar with Minnesota laws, and knew it could be sued there.
Testator's wife moved to Minnesota and was named administrator there, with nothing suggesting the move was forum shopping.

In a concurring opinion, Justice Stevens says there is no Full Faith and Credit violation unless application of forum law threatens national unity, and no Fourteenth Amendment due process violation unless application of the chosen law is totally arbitrary or fundamentally unfair.

Stevens proposed that the mere interpretation of a contract by one law or another will not threaten unity, alleviating any Full Faith and Credit Clause problem. The defendant did business in Minnesota, and knew that stacking was the majority rule, and there was no contract provision addressing stacking or forum coverage. Therefore, there was no Fourteenth Amendment due process problem. The testator's employment and post-accident move were completely irrelevant to the outcome.

Stevens further proposed that application of the law of the forum state can never be totally arbitrary because the court's familiarity with own law will make such a choice presumptively valid. Minnesota courts were wrong on application of choice-of-law, but it is not the function of the United States Supreme Court to deal with that.

Justice Powell dissented. Powell proposed that the forum state court's decision to apply its own law was valid unless there no significant contacts. He identified two policies driving :
 contacts can not be so slight and casual as to make application of forum law fundamentally unfair, touchstone is the reasonable expectations of the parties
 forum state must have a legit interest in the outcome of the litigation (even if citing public policy) – ergo, litigation must deal with thing that affect persons in the state or happened in the state.

Powell did not disagree with first prong because Defendant did business in Minnesota, and could be sued anywhere; but did not think application of Minnesota law furthers legit state interest. Powell also agreed that the post-accident move was irrelevant, and giving it weight would encourage forum shopping; also irrelevant that this insurer did business here because this insurer did business everywhere. The testator's employment in Minnesota was irrelevant to the facts of this case, where neither the policy, nor the accident, nor the stacking question had anything to do with Testator's work.

Justice Potter Stewart did not participate in the case, resulting in a 4-1-3 split.

Aftermath
The opinion enunciated the test for determining whether a "significant aggregation of contacts" existed, sufficient that "applying local law would not be fundamentally unfair", and "demonstrated how minimal this requirement is in practice".

References

United States Supreme Court cases
1981 in United States case law